97th Division()(2nd Formation) was formed in October 1950 from 1st Security Brigade of Huadong Military Region.

The division was directly belonged to East China Military Region.

The division was inactivated in May 1952 and reorganized as 2nd Agricultural Construction Division.

As of inactivation the division was composed of:
289th Regiment;
290th Regiment;
291st Regiment.

References
中国人民解放军各步兵师沿革，http://blog.sina.com.cn/s/blog_a3f74a990101cp1q.html
中国各省军区独立师的历史沿革, https://web.archive.org/web/20160918225002/http://www.360doc.com/content/13/1205/20/1164894_334784330.shtml

Infantry divisions of the People's Liberation Army
Military units and formations established in 1950
Military units and formations disestablished in 1952